Michael Walter Flinn (22 October 1917 – 28 September 1983) was a British economic historian. Born into a middle-class family in Chorlton-on-Medlock, he was educated at William Hulme's Grammar School in Manchester, serving as an officer in the Royal Artillery during the Second World War. After the end of the war, Flinn took a history degree at the University of Manchester before spending two years as a grammar school teacher while writing a postgraduate dissertation in his spare time. In 1959, he began lecturing at the University of Edinburgh, writing an introductory school textbook for history in 1961, which was still in print at his death. He was awarded a D. Litt by Edinburgh in 1965, and two years later was appointed to a Personal Chair in Social History. After his retirement in 1978, he lectured in the United States and continental Europe, serving as president of the Economic History Society from 1980 to 1983, when he died in Stroud, Gloucestershire.

References

Bibliography

1917 births
1983 deaths
Alumni of the University of Edinburgh
Academics of the University of Edinburgh
20th-century British historians
People from Chorlton-on-Medlock
British Army personnel of World War II
Royal Artillery officers